Phillip Carl Katz (December 12, 1889 – October 29, 1987) was a sergeant in the U.S. Army during World War I. He earned the Medal of Honor for his actions in combat.

Medal of Honor Citation
Rank and organization: Sergeant, U.S. Army, Company C, 363rd Infantry, 91st Division. Place and date: At Eclisfontaine, France; September 26, 1918. Entered service at: San Francisco, California. Birth: December 12, 1889; San Francisco, California. General Orders: War Department, General Orders No. 16 ( January 22, 1919).

Citation:After his company had withdrawn for a distance of 200 yards on a line with the units on its flanks, Sgt. Katz learned that one of his comrades had been left wounded in an exposed position at the point from which the withdrawal had taken place. Voluntarily crossing an area swept by heavy machine gun fire, he advanced to where the wounded soldier lay and carried him to a place of safety.

Military Awards
Katz' military decorations and awards include:

See also

List of Medal of Honor recipients for World War I

References

External links

1889 births
1987 deaths
United States Army non-commissioned officers
United States Army Medal of Honor recipients
People from San Francisco
United States Army personnel of World War I
World War I recipients of the Medal of Honor
Burials at Cypress Lawn Memorial Park
Military personnel from California